Antonio Reynoso (born May 9, 1983) is an American politician and community organizer currently serving as Borough president of Brooklyn since 2022. He is a member of the Democratic Party, and was elected Brooklyn borough president in the 2021 election. He previously was a member of the New York City Council for the 34th district from 2014 to 2021. The district included portions of Bushwick, Greenpoint, and Williamsburg in Brooklyn and Ridgewood, Queens.

Early life and career
Reynoso was born in Brooklyn and raised in the Los Sures section of Williamsburg to immigrant parents from the Dominican Republic. He graduated from Le Moyne College with a bachelor's degree in political science.

Reynoso started his political career as a Community Organizer for NYC ACORN. In 2009, he became Councilmember Diana Reyna's chief of staff.

New York City Council
In 2013, Reynoso ran for the New York City Council to succeed the term limited Diana Reyna, in whose office he previously served as Chief of Staff. Reynoso succeeded to office after defeating Vito Lopez in the Democratic primary.

Reynoso served as Chair of the New York City Council's Committee on Sanitation & Solid Waste Management, and Co-Chair of the Council's Progressive Caucus.

Political positions

Zoning 
Reynoso is one of two council members who initiated the controversial plan to rezone Bushwick.

Criminal justice 
Reynoso voted to support the eventual closure of Rikers Island and to expand New York's prison system through the controversial construction of new borough-based jails. While the vote has been described as a path towards closing the infamous prison on Riker's Island, the measure does not actually guarantee the facility's closure.

Brooklyn Borough President 
In 2021, Reynoso was elected borough president of Brooklyn.

In October 2022, Reynoso fired his deputy borough president, Diana Richardson, a former Crown Heights assemblywoman, following a string of staff and constituent complaints about her behavior,  the Daily News reported.

References

External links
 Brooklyn borough president website
 Campaign website

|-

1983 births
21st-century American politicians
American politicians of Dominican Republic descent
Hispanic and Latino American New York City Council members
Le Moyne College alumni
Living people
New York (state) Democrats
New York City Council members
Place of birth missing (living people)
Politicians from Brooklyn